is a railway station  in Ōita City, Ōita Prefecture, Japan. It is operated by JR Kyushu and is on the Kyudai Main Line.

Lines

Layout 
The station, which is unstaffed, consists of a side platform serving a single track. There is no station building only a shelter on the platform for passengers. Another shelter at the station entrance houses an automatic ticket vending machine.

Adjacent stations

History
Kaku was opened on the same day as one of several intermediate stations along the track. On 1 December 1922, the Daito Railway was nationalized and absorbed into Japanese Government Railways, (JGR) which designated the track which served the station as part of the Daito Line. On 15 November 1934, when the Daito Line had linked up with the Kyudai Main Line further west, JGR designated the station as part of the Kyudai Main Line. With the privatization of Japanese National Railways (JNR), the successor of JGR, on 1 April 1987, the station came under the control of JR Kyushu.

Passenger statistics
In fiscal 2016, the station was used by an average of 565 passengers daily (boarding passengers only), and it ranked 230th among the busiest stations of JR Kyushu.

See also
List of railway stations in Japan

References

External links
Kaku (JR Kyushu)

Railway stations in Ōita Prefecture
Railway stations in Japan opened in 1915
Ōita (city)